Krasnoye is a rural locality (a selo) in Bolsheareshevsky Selsoviet, Kizlyarsky District, Republic of Dagestan, Russia. The population was 91 as of 2010. There is 1 street.

Geography 
It is located 30 km northeast of Kizlyar, 5 km southwest of Bolshaya Areshevka.

Nationalities 
Dargins live there.

References 

Rural localities in Kizlyarsky District